Highland Holiday is an unincorporated community and census-designated place in Highland County, Ohio, United States. Its population was 550 as of the 2010 census.

Geography
Highland Holiday is in eastern Highland County, along the southern edge of Paint Township. It is bordered to the west by the Rocky Fork Point CDP. Both communities sit on the north side of Rocky Fork Lake, a reservoir built on the Rocky Fork, an east-flowing tributary of Paint Creek, which in turn flows east to the Scioto River and is part of the Ohio River watershed.

Demographics

References

Unincorporated communities in Highland County, Ohio
Unincorporated communities in Ohio
Census-designated places in Highland County, Ohio
Census-designated places in Ohio